Martin Kraus (Gräfenberg, 19 September 1524 – Tübingen, 7 March 1607), commonly Latinized as Crusius, was a German classicist and historian, and long-time professor (1559–1607) at the University of Tübingen.  He was a follower of Philip Melanchthon and wrote an epitome of Melanchthon's Elementorum rhetorices libro duo.  Kraus also wrote a commentary on the Iliad.

References

Sources 
 
 Klaus-Henning Suchland: Das Byzanzbild des Tübinger Philhellenen Martin Crusius (1526–1607). PhD dissertation. Würzburg 2001
 Panagiotis Toufexis: Das Alphabetum vulgaris linguae graecae des deutschen Humanisten Martin Crusius (1526–1607). Ein Beitrag zur Erforschung der gesprochenen griechischen Sprache im 16. Jh. (PhD dissertation, Hamburg 2003). Romiosini, Cologne 2005, 
 
 Johannes Michael Wischnath: "Fakten, Fehler und Fiktionen. Eine forschungsgeschichtliche Fußnote zu Herkunft und Todestag des Tübinger Gräzisten Martin Crusius (1526–1607)". In: Tubingensia. Impulse zur Stadt- und Universitätsgeschichte. Festschrift für Wilfried Setzler zum 65. Geburtstag. Jan Thorbecke Verlag, Ostfildern 2008, pp. 225–246
 Gerhard Philipp Wolf: "Martin Crusius (1526–1607). Philhellene und Universitätsprofessor." In: Erich Schneider: Fränkische Lebensbilder. Vol. 22. Gesellschaft für Fränkische Geschichte, Würzburg 2009, pp. 103–119.
 Crusius, (Martinus). In: Johann Heinrich Zedler: Grosses vollständiges Universal-Lexicon Aller Wissenschafften und Künste. Vol. 6, Leipzig 1733, col. 1767.
 Walther Ludwig: Hellas in Deutschland – Darstellungen der Gräzistik im deutschsprachigen Raum aus dem 16. und 17. Jahrhundert. Vandenhoeck & Ruprecht, Göttingen 1998, 

1524 births
1607 deaths
German classical philologists
Academic staff of the University of Tübingen
16th-century people of the Holy Roman Empire
Duchy of Württemberg